{{Taxobox
| name = Pardalinops testudinaria
| image = Pardalinops_testudinaria_01.jpg
| image_caption =
| regnum = Animalia
| phylum = Mollusca
| classis = Gastropoda
| unranked_superfamilia = clade Caenogastropodaclade Hypsogastropodaclade Neogastropoda
| superfamilia = Buccinoidea
| familia = Columbellidae
| subfamilia =
| genus = Pardalinops
| species = P. testudinariaa
| binomial = Pardalinops testudinaria
| binomial_authority = (Link, 1807)
| synonyms_ref = 
| synonyms =
 Columbella anitis Duclos, 1846
 Columbella electroides Reeve, 1858
 Columbella fabula G.B. Sowerby I, 1844
 Columbella japonica Reeve, 1858
 Columbella lactescens Souverbie, 1866
 Columbella padonosta Duclos, 1835
 Columbella palmerina Duclos, 1835
 Columbella pardalina Lamarck, 1822
 Columbella pardalina subcribraria Pilsbry, 1905 (suspected synonym)
 Columbella pardalina var. andamanica G. Nevill & H. Nevill, 1875
 Columbella pardalina var. bifasciata Hervier, 1900
 Columbella pardalina var. crocea Hervier, 1900
 Columbella pardalina var. elongatula Hervier, 1900
 Columbella pardalina var. fulgurata Hervier, 1900
 Columbella pardalina var. lanceolata Hervier, 1900
 Columbella pardalina var. laxa Hervier, 1900
 Columbella pardalina var. minor Hervier, 1900
 Columbella pardalina var. nigrescens Hervier, 1900
 Columbella pardalina var. picturata Hervier, 1900
 Columbella pardalina var. sublactescen Hervier, 1900
 Columbella pelotina Duclos, 1835
 Columbella picta Reeve, 1859
 Columbella quintilia Duclos, 1848
 Columbella sagena Reeve, 1859
 Columbella sulcata Duclos, 1835
 Columbella testudinaria Link, 1807
 Columbella tylerae Griffith & Pidgeon, 1834
 Columbella virginea Duclos, 1835
 Columbella vulpecula G.B. Sowerby I, 1844
 Columbella zopilla Duclos, 1848
 Pardalina testudinaria (Link, 1807)
 Pyrene lacteoides Habe & Kosuge, 1966
 Pyrene subcrebraria Pilsbry, 1905
 Pyrene testudinaria (Link, 1807)
 Pyrene testudinaria nigropardalis Habe & Kosuge, 1966
 Pyrene tylerae (Griffith & Pidgeon, 1834)
 Pyrene vulpecula (G. B. Sowerby I, 1844)
}}Pardalinops testudinaria, common name : the tortoise dove shell, is a species of sea snail, a marine gastropod mollusk in the family Columbellidae, the dove snails.

Description
The shell size varies between 10 mm and 41 mm

Distribution
This species occurs in the Red Sea, in the Indian Ocean off Tanzania; off the Philippines;  in the Western Pacific Ocean and off Australia.

References

 Spry, J.F. (1961). The sea shells of Dar es Salaam: Gastropods. Tanganyika Notes and Records 56
 Vine, P. (1986). Red Sea Invertebrates''. Immel Publishing, London. 224 pp
 Kilburn R.N. & Marais J.P. (2010) Columbellidae. Pp. 60-104, in: Marais A.P. & Seccombe A.D. (eds), Identification guide to the seashells of South Africa. Volume 1. Groenkloof: Centre for Molluscan Studies. 376 pp.

External links
 
 Link, D.H.F. (1807-1808). Beschreibung der Naturalien-Sammlung der Universität zu Rostock. Adlers Erben
 Duclos P.L. (1846-1850). Colombella. In J.C. Chenu, Illustrations conchyliologiques ou description et figures de toutes les coquilles connues vivantes et fossiles, classées suivant le système de Lamarck modifié d'après les progrès de la science et comprenant les genres nouveaux et les espèces récemment découvertes. Volume 4: pls 1-18
 Reeve, L. A. (1858–1859). Monograph of the Genus Columbella. In: Conchologia Iconica, or, illustrations of the shells of molluscous animals, vol. 11, pl. 1-37 and unpaginated text. L. Reeve & Co., London
 Sowerby, G. B., I. (1844). Monograph of the genus Columbella. In G. B. Sowerby II (ed.), Thesaurus conchyliorum, or monographs of genera of shells. Vol. 1 (4): 109-146bis, pls 36-40. London, privately published
 Souverbie (S.-M.) & Montrouzier [X.. (1866). Descriptions d'espèces nouvelles de l'Archipel Calédonien. Journal de Conchyliologie. 14: 138-151, pl. 6.]
 Duclos, P.L. (1840). Histoire naturelle générale et particulière de tous les genres de coquilles univalves marines à l'état vivant et fossile, publiée par mo­nographie. Genre Colombelle. Didot, Paris. 13 pls
 Lamarck, (J.-B. M.) de. (1822). Histoire naturelle des animaux sans vertèbres. Tome septième. Paris: published by the Author, 711 pp.
 Griffith E. & Pidgeon E. (1833-1834). The Mollusca and Radiata. Vol. 12, In: E. Griffith, (1824)−1835, The Animal Kingdom arranged in conformity with its organization, by the Baron Cuvier, (...). London: Whittaker and Co., viii + 601 pp., 61 pls.
 Nevill, G. & Nevill, H. (1875). Descriptions of new marine Mollusca from the Indian Ocean. Journal of the Asiatic Society of Bengal. 44(2): 83-104, pls. 7-8
 Hervier J. (1900 ["1899"). Le genre Columbella dans l'archipel de la Nouvelle-Calédonie. Journal de Conchyliologie. 47(4): 305–391, pls 13-14]
 Pilsbry, H. A. (1905). New Japanese marine Mollusca. Proceedings of the Academy of Natural Sciences of Philadelphia. 57

Columbellidae
Gastropods described in 1807